Jane Boyle can mean:

Jane J. Boyle (born 1954), American judge
Jane Boyle (curler) (born 1973), Canadian curler